The black guillemot or tystie (Cepphus grylle) is a medium-sized seabird of the Alcidae family, native throughout northern Atlantic coasts and eastern North American coasts. It is resident in much of its range, but large populations from the high arctic migrate southwards in winter. The bird can be seen in and around its breeding habitat of rocky shores, cliffs and islands in single or smalls groups of pairs. They feed mainly by diving towards the sea floor feeding on fish, crustaceans or other benthic invertebrates. They are listed on the IUCN red list as a species of least concern.

Both sexes have very similar appearances with black plumage and a large white patch on the upper side of their wings in summer. The bill is also black, being rather long and slender, while the feet are coral-red. In winter adult underparts are white and the upperparts are a pale grey with the back and shoulders exhibiting barred light grey and white patterning.

The birds breed in solitary pairs or small groups during their breeding season starting in late February and early May. Breeding pairs will typically lay 2-egg clutches and raise 2 chicks to fledging. Incubation typically lasts 28 to 32 days, once hatched chicks receive care from the parents until they fledge aged 30 – 40 days. Once fledged chicks are totally independent and by age three or four years they will begin to re-join their natal colony.

The genus name Cepphus is from Ancient Greek kepphos, a pale waterbird mentioned by Greek authors including Aristotle. The species name grylle was the local dialect name for this bird in Gotland at the time of Linnaeus's visit there in 1741. The English word "guillemot" is from French guillemot probably derived from Guillaume, "William".

Description

Adults have both summer and winter plumage and there is no sexual difference in this that can be identified in the field. The English common name “Black Guillemot” references their strikingly black breeding summer plumage which is totally black except for a large white patch on the upper side of their wings. During the summer plumage, their legs, feet and inside of the mouth are all a bright coral-red, and their beak is a black. Adults lose their summer plumage in an early fall moult where their upper plumage become barred with light grey and white, their head is a pale grey, their underparts white, and legs and feet a pale red. They retain their white wing patch, black beak and red inside their mouth. The call in the breeding season is a high whistle. The red gape is also prominent then.

Juveniles and immatures can easily be identified by the spotting of the white wing patch with grey or brown feathers and is easy to see even at far distances in the field.

Taxonomy and Evolution

There are five listed subspecies of the black guillemot:

C. g. mandtii – (Lichtenstein, 1822): northeast Canada to Svalbard to northern Siberia and northern Alaska
C. g. arcticus – (Brehm, 1824): northeast United States, southeast Canada and south Greenland to Ireland and Britain, southern Scandinavia and the White Sea
C. g. islandicus – (Hørring, 1937): Iceland
C. g. faroeensis – (Brehm, 1831): Faroe Islands
C. g. grylle – (Linnaeus, 1758): Baltic Sea

Distribution and habitat

The Black Guillemot is a circumpolar species distributed in the boreal, low arctic and high arctic regions of the north Atlantic and arctic oceans and breeding between 43° and 82°N. The 5 listed subspecies inhabit different parts of this range. In North America they can be found as far south as the Gulf of Maine and New England and across parts of the northern coast of North America as far as Alaska, where they are replaced by the pigeon guillemot in the North Pacific. In Europe and Asia they are found from the British Isles and Northward across the northern coast of Asia. They are one of the few birds to breed on Surtsey, Iceland, a new volcanic island. In the UK it is a fairly common breeding bird in western and northern Scotland and Ireland. In the rest of Great Britain they only breed at St. Bees Head in Cumbria, the Isle of Man and on east Anglesey in north Wales. Approximately 40% of the population breeds in the high arctic where the largest colonies are found, 30% in the low arctic, and 30% in boreal waters. In the winter some of the birds in the high arctic waters are forced south by the winter ice making them seasonal migrants, but in more temperate zones the species is essentially resident.

Typically restricted to rocky shores, black guillemots utilize the cliffs, crevices and boulders for their nests, hunting the inshore waters for benthic prey. Compared to other auks they forage fairly close to the colony, in the breeding season mostly in inshore waters more than 50m in depth, farther afield in the winter months.

Behaviour
One of the early ornithologists that described aspects of the behaviour of the black guillemot was Edmund Selous (1857-1934) in his book The Bird Watcher in the Shetlands (1905). In the chapter titled 'From the Edge of a Precipice' he writes for instance that sometimes the black guillemots carry a fish they have caught in their beak for hours. He also gives further details about the behaviour.

They dive for food from the surface, swimming underwater. They mainly eat fish and crustaceans, also some mollusks, insects and plant material.

References

Literature
 Leonard, K. 2008. Black Guillemots on the Copeland Islands in 2008. Annual Report for 2008. Copeland Bird Observatory. p. 50.

External links

black guillemot
black guillemot
Atlantic auks
Birds of the Arctic
Birds of Europe
Birds of Iceland
Birds of Scandinavia
black guillemot
black guillemot
Holarctic birds